The following are the winners of the 3rd annual ENnie Awards, held in 2003:

{| class="wikitable"
! Category
! Gold Winner
! Silver Winner
|-
|Best Cartography
|Lock and Load (Privateer Press)
|Necropolis (Necromancer Games)
|-
|Best Art, Cover
|Monsternomicon (Privateer Press)
|Midnight (Fantasy Flight Games)
|-
|Best Art, Interior
|Monsternomicon (Privateer Press)
|Freedom City (Green Ronin Publishing)
|-
|Best Graphic Design and Layout
|Monsternomicon (Privateer Press)
|Freedom City (Green Ronin Publishing)
|-
|Best Adventure
|The Banewarrens (Malhavoc Press)
|The Vault of Larin Karr (Necromancer Games)
|-
|Best Monster Supplement
|Tome of Horrors (Necromancer Games)
|Monsternomicon (Privateer Press)
|-
|Best Campaign Setting
|Midnight (Fantasy Flight Games)
|Freedom City (Green Ronin Publishing)
|-
|Best Setting Supplement
|Magical Medieval Society: Western Europe (Expeditious Retreat Press)
|Book of the Righteous (Green Ronin Publishing)
|-
|Best Rules Supplement
|Dynasties & Demagogues (Atlas Games)
|Toolbox (AEG)
|-
|Best d20 Game
|Mutants & Masterminds (Green Ronin Publishing)
|Sláine: The Roleplaying Game of Celtic Heroes (Mongoose Publishing)
|-
|Best Non-Open-Gaming Product
|Unknown Armies 2nd Edition'" (Atlas Games)
|Spaceship Zero (Green Ronin Publishing)
|-
|Best Aid or Accessory
|GM Mastery: NPC Essentials (RPG Objects)
|Kingdoms of Kalamar DM Shield (Kenzer & Company)
|-
|Best Official Website
|Malhavoc Press
|Wizards of the Coast
|-
|Best Resource Fan Site
|SWRPG Network
|3rdEdition.org
|-
|Best Campaign Web Site
|Conan d20
|World of Inzeladun
|-
|Best Free Product or Web Enhancement
|Magical Medieval City Guide (Expeditious Retreat Press)
|Initiative Cards (The Game Mechanics)
|-
|Best Electronic Product
|Magical Medieval City Guide (Expeditious Retreat Press)
|Mindscapes (Malhavoc Press)
|-
|Best Publisher
|Malhavoc Press
|Green Ronin Publishing
|}

Peer Award: Mutants & Masterminds'' (Green Ronin Publishing)

References

External links
 2003 ENnie Awards

 
ENnies winners